Regional floras typically contain complete dichotomous keys for identification of trees and other plants to species (e.g. Manual of vascular plants of northeastern United States and adjacent Canada by Henry A. Gleason and Arthur Cronquist). The following guide originates from Our Native Trees and How to Identify Them by Harriet L. Keeler and applies to some flowering trees which are indigenous to the region extending from the Atlantic Ocean to the Rocky Mountains and from Canada to the northern boundaries of the southern states, together with a few well-known and naturalized foreign trees. This guide excludes conifers and is not an exhaustive list of all trees known to occur in the region.

Use of the guide
Trees can be identified by examination of several characteristics. The typical leaves of a species should be secured from mature trees, not young ones. The leaflets of a compound leaf can be distinguished from simple leaves by the absence of leaf buds from the base of their stems.

To identify a tree check one of the following characteristics, and if it is present then examine the characteristics at the next level of indentation. For example, if the tree has simple leaves then check whether the leaves alternate along stem or leaves are opposite along stem.

 Simple leaves
 Leaves alternate along stem
 Margins entire
 Oblong-ovate or obovate, large, thick: magnolia
 Oblong, sub-evergreen at the south: sweetbay magnolia
 Evergreen: rhododendron, kalmia
 Obovate, 15-30 cm long: pawpaw
 Oblong, thick, shining, 5-12 cm long: black tupelo
 Oblong, tree occurring sparingly at the north: American persimmon
 Heart-shaped: eastern redbud
 Leaves of three forms; oval, two-lobed, or three-lobed; frequently all three on one spray: sassafras
 Thick, shining, willow-shaped: shingle oak, willow oak
 Thick, shining, ovate, spines in the axils: Osage-orange
 Broadly oval or obovate, veins prominent, leaves usually in clusters at the ends of the branches: pagoda dogwood
 Margins slightly indented
 Obliquely heart-shaped: linden
 Obliquely oval: elm
 Obliquely ovate: hackberry
 Oval or ovate, doubly serrate: birch (see Betula classification), American hornbeam
 Repand with spiny teeth: American holly
 Coarsely-toothed, twigs bearing thorns: black locust
 Of quivering habit, petioles compressed: poplar
 Long, slender, finely serrate: willow
 Coarsely crenately-toothed: chestnut oak
 Obovate or oval; wavy-toothed: witch-hazel
 Serrate: plum, cherry, crabapple, sourwood, juneberry, silverbell, beech
 Margins lobed
 Lobes entire
 Apex truncate, three-lobed: tulip tree
 Lobes and sinuses rounded: white oak
 Lobes rounded, lobes 2 or 3: sassafras
 Lobed or coarsely toothed, under surface covered with white down: white poplar
 Lobes slightly indented
 Five-lobed, finely serrate: American sweetgum
 Variously lobed, irregularly toothed: mulberry
 Lobes coarsely toothed
 Irregularly toothed, lobes bristle pointed: northern red oak
 Leaf broad, lobes coarsely toothed: American sycamore
 Leaves are opposite along stem
 Margins entire
 Ovate, veins prominent: flowering dogwood
 Heart-shaped, large: catalpa
 Oval: fringe tree
 Margins serrate: sweet viburnum, black haw viburnum
 Margins lobed: maple
 Compound leaves
 Leaves pinnately compound
 Alternate
 Margin of leaflets entire
 Leaflets oval, apex obtuse: black locust
 Leaflets oblong apex acute: poison sumac
 Leaflets oval or ovate: yellowwood (Cladrastis kentukea)
 Leaflets ovate — three in number: hoptree (Ptelea trifoliata)
 Margin of leaflets with two or three teeth at base: tree of heaven
 Margin of leaflets serrate: sumac, rowan, walnut, hickory
 Opposite
 Margin of leaflets entire: ash
 Margin of leaflets serrate: ash
 Margin of leaflets coarsely toothed: boxelder maple
 Leaves bi-pinnately compound
 Margins of leaflets entire: Kentucky coffeetree
 Irregularly bi-pinnate, margins of leaflets entire, thorns on stems above the axils of the leaves: honey locust
 Margins of leaflets serrate, stems spiny: prickly ash
 Leaves palmately compound: Ohio buckeye, common horse-chestnut

See also 

 Identification key
 Leaf shape

External links

 What Tree Is It? (OPLIN)
 Tree identification resources
 Tree Identification software for Kerala State, India - CD

References 

Trees of the United States